The 1980 Cincinnati Bengals season was the franchise's 10th season in the National Football League, and the 13th overall. The Bengals went 6–10 and managed only 244 points, lowest in the AFC. They did upset defending Super Bowl champion Pittsburgh twice. First-round draft choice Anthony Muñoz began his Hall of Fame career. This was the final season the Bengals wore the Cleveland Browns style uniforms.

Offseason

NFL draft

Personnel

Staff

Roster

Regular season

Schedule

Week 1

Week 2

Week 3

Week 16

Standings

References

External links
 1980 Cincinnati Bengals at Pro-Football-Reference.com

Cincinnati Bengals
Cincinnati Bengals seasons
Cinc